Cris Williamson (born 1947) is an American feminist singer-songwriter and recording artist. She was a visible lesbian political activist, during an era when few who were unconnected to the lesbian community were aware of Gay and Lesbian issues. Williamson's music and insight have served as a catalyst for change in the creation of women-owned record companies in the 1970s. Using her musical talents, networking with other artists working in Women's music, and her willingness to represent those who did not yet feel safe in speaking for themselves, Williamson is credited by many in the LGBT community for her contributions, both artistically, and politically, and continues to be a role model for a younger generation hoping to address concerns and obtain recognition for achievements specific to people who have historically been ignored.

Biography

Early years
Williamson was born in 1947 in Deadwood, South Dakota, although her family moved to Colorado and Wyoming when she was still young. Williamson has recalled that she lived in a small isolated town and at some expense, was taken to piano lessons by her mother from when she was around 5 or 6 years of age.  Her mother insisted that "no matter how far out in the mountains or the wilderness we are, my kids are going to have culture." Her musical idol at the time was Judy Collins, and Williamson developed a musical style and sound that was similar to that of Collins. She released her first album, The Artistry of Cris Williamson in 1964, when she was sixteen. She became a local musical sensation in Sheridan, Wyoming, releasing two following LPs afterward. Williamson graduated from the University of Denver. She supported herself initially as a school teacher, while at the same time collaborating with other women who were also singer-songwriters and performing artists. She began to network with Holly Near, Meg Christian, and Margie Adam, all musicians who became women artists of stature, forming an entirely new genre of music, primarily about and for women.

Career

Olivia Records
Williamson became close friends with Meg Christian and during a radio interview in Washington, D.C. in 1973, when Christian was discussing the challenges with her record label, Williamson is recorded as asking  "well, why don’t you just start a women’s record company?" A group, which became the Olivia collective, met two days later and decided to establish a women’s record label aimed at gay women. The independent label Olivia Records was founded the next day. The founders of the label saw it as an opportunity to build on the increased awareness of lesbian feminist causes and give gay women a voice in the cultural mainstream that reflected their experiences.  The founders also aimed to "keep profits in the pockets of lesbian artists and sound technicians, and power in the hands of female label heads who would create alternative channels for production and distribution in an industry controlled by men." The label was criticised at the time as being discriminatory, but Williamson said they were "for women, not against men...[adding]...why is it like that, the dichotomy? It's a false equivalency. It's a way to dumb it down and take the power out of it."

Olivia Records released Williamson's The Changer and the Changed (1975) which became one of the best-selling independent releases of all time. Described as "the cornerstone of the feminist 'women's music' movement", the album was rated in 2017 as number 123 on the NPR (National Public Radio) list of the greatest albums made by women.  The Changer and the Changed was also the first LP to be entirely produced by women, and is the all-time best-selling album to come out of the women's music genre. As William Ruhlmann of AllMusic writes:

"The Changer and the Changed was to women's music what Michael Jackson's Thriller was to the music industry in general in the mid-'80s, an album that sold far beyond the perceived size of the market, more than 100,000 copies in its first year of release. Eventually, it reportedly sold more than 500,000 copies, which would make it a gold album, although it has not been certified as such by the RIAA. (That does not disprove the sales estimate, however. Albums are not certified automatically; a record company must request certification and pay for an audit.)"

Williamson went on to record more than a dozen further albums with Olivia Records, then after its demise formed her own label, Wolf Moon Records. This helped to set the pace for other recording artists who found it difficult to work with the major record labels.

In 1982, she collaborated with Estonian artist/author Viido Polikarpus on a science fiction/fantasy fable LP and book (with Polikarpos' artwork) entitled Lumiere, which was released on Pacific Cascade Records.

Personal life

Williamson recorded two albums with her long-time producer and lover, Tret Fure. The first of these  of these, recorded in the fall of 1982, was a children's album called Lumiere ...A Science-Fantasy Fable, which won a Parents' Choice Award.  Fure is said to have helped "add a more produced, harder-rocking sound to Williamson's LPs Prairie Fire and Wolf Moon...[and]...with Postcards from Paradise, the two abandoned their solo careers to form a permanent duo act." Williamson and Fure ended their 20-year relationship in 2000, and each now records as a solo artist.

Williamson has worked as a session musician both to support herself and to lend assistance to other fellow artists.  She has collaborated with other women's music artists, including Meg Christian and Teresa Trull. She has friends in many corners; one longtime friend is musician Bonnie Raitt, who has played on some of her albums.

Political activism and charity work

Williamson has been a lesbian feminist and a promoter of women owned music companies. 

Writing in the Los Angeles Times in 1984, Steve Pond noted that Williamson was "initially put off by the political stridency of the early Olivia scene" but became more active and in the same article she is quoted as saying: "There are a lot of broken women in the women's movement, women just edged and barbed and ready to go off, and a lot of women who simply do not want Olivia to change."

She has worked on a teaching project with Bonnie Raitt that offered songwriting workshops called 'Catch and Release.'

Sampled by J Dilla

Williamson's "Shine on Straight Arrow" was sampled by late hip hop producer J Dilla in the song "The Red" from the 2003 album Champion Sound (with Madlib as Jaylib).

Awards
On 12 September 2022  Williamson received the Jack Emerson Lifetime Achievement Award from the Americana Music Association along with Judy Dlugacz who co-founded Olivia Records. At the ceremony, Williamson noted: "We've sold out Carnegie Hall three times. This is the first time we've been acknowledged by the industry...[adding]...a woman singing to another woman...it’s not such a big deal now, because now love is love is love."

Discography

1964 The Artistry of Cris Williamson
1965 A Step at a Time
1965 The World Around Cris Williamson
1971 Cris Williamson
1975 The Changer and the Changed
1978 Live Dream
1980 Strange Paradise
1982  Blue Rider
1982  Lumière
1983  Meg/Cris at Carnegie Hall
1985  Prairie Fire
1985  Snow Angel
1987  Wolf Moon
1989  Country Blessed (with Teresa Trull)
1990  The Best of Cris Williamson
1991  Live in Concert: Circle of Friends
1994  Postcards from Paradise
1997  Between the Covers
1999  Radio Quiet
2001  Ashes
2003  Cris & Holly (with Holly Near)
2003  Replay
2005  The Essential Cris Williamson
2005  Real Deal
2005  The Changer and the Changed: A Record of the Times [30th Anniversary Enhanced]
2007  Fringe
2008  Winter Hearts
2010  Gifthorse
2013  Pray Tell
2017  Motherland
2022  Harbor Street

References

External links
 
 
 
  Some of Cris' biographical and professional information

1947 births
Living people
American women singer-songwriters
American feminists
American folk singers
Feminist musicians
LGBT people from South Dakota
Lesbian feminists
American lesbian musicians
20th-century American singers
21st-century American singers
People from Deadwood, South Dakota
People from Sheridan, Wyoming
Women's music
Guitarists from Wyoming
Guitarists from South Dakota
20th-century American women singers
21st-century American women singers
20th-century American women guitarists
20th-century American guitarists
American LGBT singers
20th-century American LGBT people
21st-century American LGBT people
Singer-songwriters from Wyoming
Singer-songwriters from South Dakota